Andriy Komarytskyi (born 2 February 1982) is a professional footballer.

Career
He is the starting goalkeeper for Stal and has been playing there since 1999. In 2004 it was recorded that he wanted to advance to the Ukrainian Premier League with Stal, which happened the following year.

External links

References 

1982 births
Living people
Footballers from Luhansk
Ukrainian footballers
Ukrainian footballers banned from domestic competitions
Association football goalkeepers
FC Shakhtar Luhansk players
FC Stal Alchevsk players
FC Stal-2 Alchevsk players
FC Zorya Luhansk players
FC Arsenal Kyiv players